Ola is a South African ice cream brand name that is part of the Unilever company. It falls under the "Heartbrand" brand umbrella.

In 2003, Ola acquired the Milky Lane and Juicy Lucy brands.

References

External links
 Ola South Africa

South African brands
Unilever brands